Dan Farr (born February 15, 1967) is an entrepreneur, known for co-founding Daz 3D, a 3D content and software company, and for founding Salt Lake Comic Con.

Career
Dan Farr co-founded Daz 3D Inc. in 2000. Daz 3D is a company that develops and publishes 3D digital content and software for creative professionals and hobbyists. Two of the products Farr helped create while at DAZ were Daz Studio and Genesis Platform.

In 2005 Farr, along with his partners at Daz 3D, created an illustrated Christmas book entitled Mr. Finnegan’s Giving Chest using Daz 3D's products and featured actor Dick Van Dyke.

Shortly after leaving Daz 3D in the spring of 2012, Farr began planning Salt Lake Comic Con, a biannual comic book convention. The name of the convention was changed to FanX after a lawsuit was filed by San Diego Comic Con, and the San Diego Con was awarded $20,000 in damages.

References

Businesspeople from Salt Lake City
1967 births
Place of birth missing (living people)
Living people